The 1967 South Carolina Gamecocks football team represented the University of South Carolina as a member of the Atlantic Coast Conference (ACC) during the 1967 NCAA University Division football season. Led by second-year head coach Paul Dietzel, the Gamecocks compiled an overall record of 5–5 with a mark of 4–2 in conference play, placing third in the ACC. The team played home games at Carolina Stadium in Columbia, South Carolina.

Schedule

References

South Carolina
South Carolina Gamecocks football seasons
South Carolina Gamecocks football